V533 Herculis was a nova visible to the naked eye, which occurred in 1963 in the constellation of Hercules. 

The nova was discovered by the Swedish amateur astronomer Elis Dahlgren on 6 February 1963, and independently by an American amateur, Leslie Peltier, on 7 February 1963. 
Both reported it to be a 4th magnitude star.
Subsequent examination of pre-discovery images, taken by the Baker-Nunn satellite tracking group at the Tokyo Observatory, showed that the star had begun its nova event as early as 18:36 UT on 26 January 1963, when it had an magnitude of 8.  It had attained its peak brightness, magnitude 3, by 17:38 UT on 30 January 1968.

All novae are binary stars, with a "donor" star transferring matter to a white dwarf.   In the case of V533 Herculis, the pair's orbital period is 3.43 hours.  Thorstensen and Taylor analysed spectra of the star in its quiescent state, and concluded that it is a non-eclipsing SW Sextantis  variable, implying that the donor star is a red dwarf. Knigge derived a mass of 0.225 M⊙, and a radius of 0.333 R⊙, for the donor star.

Images of V533 Herculis taken with the Hubble Space Telescope show a faint, approximately circular shell (nebula) with a diameter of 10±1.4 arc seconds, surrounding the star.   The shell is expanding at 850±150 km/sec.  Santamaria et al. obtained similar results by comparing images of the shell taken in 1993 and 2018.  They found that by 2018 the slightly elliptical shell had major and minor axis of 16.8×15.2 arc seconds, and it was expanding at a rate of 0.152×0.139  arc seconds per year, implying a physical expansion rate of 850×770 km/sec.

References

External links
 Report (not in English)

Novae
Hercules (constellation)
1963 in science
Herculis, V533